Oskari Johannes Orevillo Kekkonen (born 24 September 1999) is a professional footballer who plays as a midfielder for Ykkönen club PK-35 and the Philippines national team.

Born in Finland to a Filipino mother and a Finnish father, he played for his birth country at youth level before switching international allegiance to the Philippines in 2021.

Club career
Born in Kotka, Finland, to a Filipino mother and a Finnish father, he made his first-team debut for KTP in 2016, at the age of 17. He then played for Sudet, FC Lahti, FC Kuusysi and PKKU.

On 21 July 2018, he re-joined KTP on loan from FC Lahti until the end of the season. In April 2019 it appeared from SJK Seinäjoki's website, that Kekkonen had become a part of the club's U20 squad. He returned to his childhood club, Peli-Karhut, in April 2019. In September 2019, Kekkonen joined PEPO Lappeenranta.

As of October 2021, he was signed with the Azkals Development Team of the Philippines Football League. In his first tournament with the club, they finished as runners-up of the 2021 Copa Paulino Alcantara. In January 2022 he moved to Kaya-Iloilo.

He returned to Finland with PK-35 for the 2023 season.

International career

Finland U18
Kekkonen played for Finland's under-18 team in the 2017 Baltic Cup. He came on as a 75th minute sub in their opening match where Finland defeated Latvia 4–0.

Philippines U23
He then played for the Philippines under-23 team at the 2022 AFC U-23 Asian Cup qualifiers. He made his debut on 25 October 2021, coming on as a 33rd minute substitute in their 3–0 loss to South Korea U23. Kekkonen was included in the 20-man squad for 31st Southeast Asian Games, which was held in Vietnam. Kekkonen scored his first goal for Philippines U23 in a 4–0 win against Timor-Leste.

Philippines
Kekkonen was named in the Philippines' squad for the 2020 AFF Championship. He made his senior international debut on 8 December 2021 as a substitute in their 2–1 loss to hosts Singapore.

References

1999 births
Living people
People from Kotka
Filipino footballers
Philippines international footballers
Philippines youth international footballers
Finnish footballers
Finland youth international footballers
Finnish people of Filipino descent
Filipino people of Finnish descent
Kotkan Työväen Palloilijat players
Citizens of the Philippines through descent
Sudet players
FC Lahti players
FC Kuusysi players
Pallokerho Keski-Uusimaa players
Ykkönen players
Kakkonen players
Veikkausliiga players
Association football midfielders
PEPO Lappeenranta players
Azkals Development Team players
Kaya F.C. players
Sportspeople from Kymenlaakso
Competitors at the 2021 Southeast Asian Games
Southeast Asian Games competitors for the Philippines
PK-35 Vantaa (men) players